Oravský Biely Potok is a village and municipality in Tvrdošín District in the Žilina Region of northern Slovakia.

History
In historical records the village was first mentioned in 1567.

Geography
The municipality lies at an altitude of 644 metres and covers an area of 18.447 km². It has a population of about 627 people.

External links
https://web.archive.org/web/20080111223415/http://www.statistics.sk/mosmis/eng/run.html 
http://www.oravskybielypotok.sk/
https://web.archive.org/web/20070914195506/http://www.orawa.sk/oravskybielypotok

Villages and municipalities in Tvrdošín District